Euwallengrenia is a genus of moths in the family Lasiocampidae. It was described by David Stephen Fletcher in 1968.

Some species in this genus are:
Euwallengrenia rectilineata (Aurivillius, 1905)
Euwallengrenia reducta (Walker, 1855)

External links

Lasiocampidae